Soyedina is a genus of stoneflies belonging to the family Nemouridae. This exclusively Nearctic genus was originally erected as a subgenus of Nemoura but was elevated to genus status by Joachim Illies in 1966. There are currently 11 described species, most only identifiable by small differences in the genitalia.

Species

Soyedina alexandria
Soyedina calcarea
Soyedina carolinensis
Soyedina interrupta
Soyedina kondratieffi
Soyedina merritti
Soyedina nevadensis
Soyedina parkeri
Soyedina potteri
Soyedina producta
Soyedina sheldoni
Soyedina vallicularia
Soyedina washingtoni

References
Myers, P., R. Espinosa, C. S. Parr, T. Jones, G. S. Hammond, and T. A. Dewey. 2006. The Animal Diversity Web (online). Accessed at http://animaldiversity.org
Soyedina alexandria and S. calcarea (Plecoptera: Nemouridae), new stonefly species from the eastern Nearctic region and notes on the life cycle of S. calcarea

Fauna of North America
Nemouridae
Plecoptera genera